Aliko is a given name. Notable people with the name include:

Aliko Bala (born 1997), Nigerian footballer
Aliko Dangote (born 1957), Nigerian business magnate and philanthropist
Aliko Kibona (born 1956), Tanzanian politician 

African given names